Bomi is a small town in Pujehun District in the Southern Province of Sierra Leone, near the border of Liberia. As of 2009 it had an estimated population of 6,117.

See also
2014 Ebola virus epidemic in Liberia

References

Populated places in Sierra Leone